James Marshall McEachern (June 2, 1881 – April 26, 1969) was an American track and field athlete who competed in the 1920 Summer Olympics and in the 1924 Summer Olympics. He was born in Georgetown, Prince Edward Island, Canada and died in San Francisco, California.

In 1920 he finished eighth in the hammer throw competition and tenth in the 56 pound weight throw event. Four years later he finished sixth in the hammer throw competition.

References

External links

1881 births
1969 deaths
People from Kings County, Prince Edward Island
Canadian emigrants to the United States
American male hammer throwers
Olympic track and field athletes of the United States
Athletes (track and field) at the 1920 Summer Olympics
Athletes (track and field) at the 1924 Summer Olympics
Olympic weight throwers